Orazio Farnese, Duke of Castro (Valentano, February 1532 – Hesdin, 18 July 1553) was the third duke of Castro. He was the son of Pier Luigi Farnese, Duke of Parma, and his wife Gerolama Orsini. He married Diane de France on 14 February 1552. Orazio was at Hesdin when Emperor Charles V placed the city under siege. Orazio was killed 16 July 1553.

References

Bibliography
  Edoardo del Vecchio, I Farnese, Istituto di Studi Romani Editore, 1972.
  Emilio Nasalli Rocca, I Farnese, Milano, Dall'Oglio, 1969.

1532 births
1553 deaths
Orazio
Orazio